Teresa Amott is an American economist and academic administrator, who served as the 19th president of Knox College in Galesburg, Illinois.

Career 
Prior to serving as president of Knox College, Amott was a professor of economics at Wellesley College, the University of Massachusetts Boston, University of Massachusetts Amherst, Gettysburg College, and the Hobart and William Smith Colleges. She was also a visiting professor of women's studies at Harvard Divinity School. Amott worked as a policy advisor on the Jesse Jackson 1988 presidential campaign. Amott has worked as an editor for Dollars & Sense, an economics publication. From 1988 to 1995, she was a member of the board of Bread for the World, a Christian advocacy organization.

She served as a professor of economics and chair of the economics department at Bucknell University. Amott was selected to serve as the president of Knox College in 2011.

In March 2020, Amott announced her intention to retire as president in June 2021.

Selected works
 Race, gender, and work : a multicultural economic history of women in the United States
 Caught in the crisis : women and the U.S. economy today, 1993
 Women and welfare reform : women's poverty, women's opportunities, and women's welfare : conference proceedings, transcript of presentations and discussion, 1994

References 

Living people
Smith College alumni
Boston College alumni
Knox College (Illinois) faculty
American economists
Wellesley College faculty
University of Massachusetts Boston faculty
University of Massachusetts Amherst faculty
Gettysburg College faculty
Hobart and William Smith Colleges faculty
Bucknell University faculty
Harvard Divinity School faculty
Year of birth missing (living people)